Lower Lake Cemetery, also known as Lower Lake Catholic Cemetery, is a cemetery located in Lower Lake, Lake County, California. As of 2014, it contains more than 5,800 interments, one of which belongs to Major League Baseball player Ted Easterly.

References

1850 establishments in California
Buildings and structures in Lake County, California
Cemeteries in California
Lower Lake, California